The 2018 Zhengzhou Women's Tennis Open was a professional tennis tournament played on outdoor hard courts. It was the fifth edition of the tournament and part of the 2018 WTA 125K series, offering a total of $125,000 in prize money. It took place in Zhengzhou, China, on 16–22 April 2018.

Singles main draw entrants

Seeds 

 1 Rankings as of 9 April 2018.

Other entrants 
The following players received wildcards into the singles main draw:
  Peng Shuai
  Tian Ran
  Wang Xiyu
  Yang Zhaoxuan
  Yuan Yue

The following players received entry from the qualifying draw:
  Mai Minokoshi
  Ankita Raina
  Ayano Shimizu
  Xun Fangying

The following players received entry as Lucky Losers:
  You Xiaodi
  Zhang Kailin

Withdrawals 
  Lu Jingjing → replaced by  Zhang Kailin
  Zhang Shuai → replaced by  You Xiaodi

Doubles entrants

Seeds 

 1 Rankings as of 9 April 2018.

Other entrants
The following pair received a wildcard into the main draw:
  Tian Ran /  Zhang Kailin

Champions

Singles

 Zheng Saisai def.  Wang Yafan 5–7, 6–2, 6–1

Doubles

 Duan Yingying /  Wang Yafan def.  Naomi Broady /  Yanina Wickmayer 7–6(7–5), 6–3

External links 
 
 Official website 

2018 WTA 125K series
2018 in Chinese tennis
Zhengzhou Open